Dactylaria is a genus of fungi belonging to the family Calloriaceae. The genus was first described by Pier Andrea Saccardo in 1880, and the type species is designated as Dactylaria purpurella.

The genus has cosmopolitan distribution.

Species

A few species in the genus:

Dactylaria acaciae 
Dactylaria acanthacearum 
Dactylaria acerina

References

External links
Dactylaria occurrence data and images from GBIF

Leotiomycetes
Taxa described in 1880
Taxa named by Pier Andrea Saccardo
Leotiomycetes genera